"Something That You Said" is a song by Australian pop/new wave group Kids in the Kitchen. The song was released in April 1985 as the third single from their debut studio album Shine (1985). The song peaked at number 19 on the Australian Kent Music Report.

Track listing 
7" (K9578) 
Side A "Something That You Said" - 3:57
Side B "The Cruel Tune"

12"' (X14169)
Side A1 "Something That You Said" (club mix) - 5:36
Side A2 "Bruce's Big Bonus Beats"
Side B1 "Something That You Said" (dub)
Side B2 "Something That You Said" (instrumental) - 3:56

Charts

References 

1985 songs
1985 singles
Kids in the Kitchen songs
Mushroom Records singles